Husby may refer to:

Places

Denmark
Husby, Denmark, a village in Holstebro Municipality

Germany
Husby, Germany, a municipality in the Hürup area of Schleswig-Holstein
Hüsby, a municipality in the Arensharde area of Schleswig-Holstein

Norway
Husby, Norway, a village in Nesna, Nordland County
Husby Chapel, a chapel in Nesna
Husby Estate, an old estate in Nesna, Nordland County

Sweden
Husby, Stockholm, a district in Stockholm
Husby metro station, a metro station in Stockholm
Husby, Hedemora, district in Hedemora
Husby (estate), a collection of royal estates in the Uppsala öd of the Swedish King
Västra Husby, a locality situated in Söderköping Municipality, Östergötland County
Östra Husby, a locality situated in Norrköping Municipality, Östergötland County
Husby Court District, a district of Dalarna
Husby AIK, a Swedish football club located in Dala-Husby

People
Per Husby (born 1944), Norwegian musician, teacher, civil engineer, and orchestra leader
Stig Roar Husby (born 1954), retired Norwegian long-distance runner
Olaf Husby (1878–1948), Norwegian sport shooter
 Hans Husby, former lead vocalist of the Norwegian death-punk band Turbonegro